Chociszewo may refer to the following places:
Chociszewo, Greater Poland Voivodeship (west-central Poland)
Chociszewo, Kuyavian-Pomeranian Voivodeship (north-central Poland)
Chociszewo, Masovian Voivodeship (east-central Poland)
Chociszewo, Lubusz Voivodeship (west Poland)